Costume or fashion jewelry includes a range of decorative items worn for personal adornment that are manufactured as less expensive ornamentation to complement a particular fashionable outfit or garment as opposed to "real" (fine) jewelry, which is more costly and which may be regarded primarily as collectibles, keepsakes, or investments. From the outset, costume jewelry — also known as fashion jewelry — paralleled the styles of its more precious fine counterparts

Terminology
It is also known as artificial jewellery, imitation jewellery, imitated  jewelry, trinkets, fashion jewelry, junk jewelry, fake jewelry, or fallalery.

Etymology
The term costume jewelry dates back to the early 20th century. It reflects the use of the word "costume" to refer to what is now called an "outfit".

Components

Originally, costume or fashion jewelry was made of inexpensive simulated gemstones, such as rhinestones or lucite, set in pewter, silver, nickel, or brass. During the depression years, rhinestones were even down-graded by some manufacturers to meet the cost of production.

During the World War II era, sterling silver was often incorporated into costume jewelry designs primarily because:
 The components used for base metal were needed for wartime production (i.e., military applications), and a ban was placed on their use in the private sector.
 Base metal was originally popular because it could approximate platinum's color, sterling silver fulfilled the same function. 
This resulted in a number of years during which sterling silver costume jewelry was produced and some can still be found in today's vintage jewelry marketplace.

Modern costume jewelry incorporates a wide range of materials. High-end crystals, cubic zirconia simulated diamonds, and some semi-precious stones are used in place of precious stones. Metals include gold- or silver-plated brass, and sometimes vermeil or sterling silver. Lower-priced jewelry may still use gold plating over pewter, nickel, or other metals; items made in countries outside the United States may contain lead. Some pieces incorporate plastic, acrylic, leather, or wood.

Historical expression
Costume jewelry can be characterized by the period in history in which it was made.

Art Deco period (1920–1930s)
The Art Deco movement was an attempt to combine the harshness of mass production with the sensitivity of art and design. It was during this period that Coco Chanel introduced costume jewelry to complete the costume. The Art Deco movement died with the onset of the Great Depression and the outbreak of World War II.

According to Schiffer, some of the characteristics of the costume jewelry in the Art Deco period were: 
Free-flowing curves were replaced with a harshly geometric and symmetrical theme
Long pendants, bangle bracelets, cocktail rings, and elaborate accessory items such as cigarette cases and holders

Retro period (1935 to 1950)
In the Retro period, designers struggled with the art versus mass production dilemma. Natural materials merged with plastics. The retro period primarily included American-made jewelry, which had a distinctly American look. With the war in Europe, many European jewelry firms were forced to shut down. Many European designers emigrated to the U.S. since the economy was recovering.

According to Schiffer, some of the characteristics of costume jewelry in the Retro period were:
Glamour, elegance, and sophistication
Flowers, bows, and sunburst designs with a Hollywood flair
Moonstones, horse motifs, military influence, and ballerinas
Bakelite and other plastic jewelry

Art Modern period (1945 to 1960)

In the Art Modern period following World War II, jewelry designs became more traditional and understated. The big, bold styles of the Retro period went out of style and were replaced by the more tailored styles of the 1950s and 1960s.

According to Schiffer, some of the characteristics of costume jewelry in the Art Modern period were:
Bold, lavish jewelry
Large, chunky bracelets, charm bracelets, Jade/opal, citrine and topaz
Poodle pins, Christmas tree pins, and other Christmas jewelry
Rhinestones

With the advent of the Mod period came "Body Jewelry".  Carl Schimel of Kim Craftsmen Jewelry was at the forefront of this style.  While Kim Craftsmen closed in the early 1990s, many collectors still forage for their items at antique shows and flea markets.

General history
Costume jewelry has been part of the culture for almost 300 years. During the 18th century, jewelers began making pieces with inexpensive glass. In the 19th century, costume jewelry made of semi-precious material came into the market. Jewels made of semi-precious material were more affordable, and this affordability gave common people the chance to own costume jewelry.

But the real golden era for costume jewelry began in the middle of the 20th century. The new middle class wanted beautiful, but affordable jewelry. The demand for jewelry of this type coincided with the machine age and the industrial revolution. The revolution made the production of carefully executed replicas of admired heirloom pieces possible.

As the class structure in America changed, so did measures of real wealth. Women in all social stations, even the working-class woman, could own a small piece of costume jewelry. The average town and countrywoman could acquire and wear a considerable amount of this mass-produced jewelry that was both affordable and stylish.

Costume jewelry was also made popular by various designers in the mid-20th century. Some of the most remembered names in costume jewelry include both the high and low priced brands: Crown Trifari, Dior, Chanel, Miriam Haskell, Monet, Napier, Corocraft, Coventry, and Kim Craftsmen.

A significant factor in the popularization of costume jewelry was Hollywood movies. The leading female stars of the 1940s and 1950s often wore and then endorsed the pieces produced by a range of designers. If you admired a necklace worn by Bette Davis in The Private Lives of Elizabeth and Essex, you could buy a copy from Joseff of Hollywood, who made the original. Stars such as Vivien Leigh, Elizabeth Taylor, and Jane Russell appeared in adverts for the pieces and the availability of the collections in shops such as Woolworth made it possible for ordinary women to own and wear such jewelry.

Coco Chanel greatly popularized the use of faux jewelry in her years as a fashion designer, bringing costume jewelry to life with gold and faux pearls.
Kenneth Jay Lane has since the 1960s been known for creating unique pieces for Jackie Onassis, Elizabeth Taylor, Diana Vreeland, and Audrey Hepburn. He is probably best known for his three-strand faux pearl necklace worn by Barbara Bush to her husband's inaugural ball.

In many instances, high-end fashion jewelry has achieved a "collectible" status and increased value over time. Today, there is a substantial secondary market for vintage fashion jewelry. The main collecting market is for 'signed pieces', that is pieces that have the maker's mark, usually stamped on the reverse. Amongst the most sought after are Miriam Haskell, Coro, Butler and Wilson, Crown Trifari, and Sphinx. However, there is also demand for good quality 'unsigned' pieces, especially if they are of an unusual design.

Business and industry 
Costume jewelry is considered a discrete category of fashion accessory and displays many characteristics of a self-contained industry. Costume jewelry manufacturers are located throughout the world, with a particular concentration in parts of China and India, where entire citywide and region-wide economies are dominated by the trade of these goods. There has been considerable controversy in the United States and elsewhere about the lack of regulations in the manufacture of such jewelry—these range from human rights issues surrounding the treatment of labor, to the use of manufacturing processes in which small, but potentially harmful, amounts of toxic metals are added during production. In 2010, the Associated Press released the story that toxic levels of the metal cadmium were found in children's jewelry. An Associated Press investigation found some pieces contained more than 80 percent of cadmium. The wider issues surrounding imports, exports, trade laws, and globalization also apply to the costume jewelry trade.

As part of the supply chain, wholesalers in the United States and other nations purchase costume jewelry from manufacturers and typically import or export it to wholesale distributors and suppliers who deal directly with retailers. Wholesale costume jewelry merchants will traditionally seek out new suppliers at trade shows. As the Internet has become increasingly important in global trade, the trade-show model has changed. Retailers can now select from a large number of wholesalers with sites on the World Wide Web. The wholesalers purchase from international suppliers who are also available on the Web from different parts of the world like Chinese, Korean, Indonesian, Thai, and Indian jewelry companies, with their wide range of products in bulk quantities. Some of these sites also market directly to consumers who can purchase costume jewelry at greatly reduced prices. Some of these websites categorize fashion jewelry separately, while others use this term in place of costume jewelry. The trend of jewelry-making at home by hobbyists for personal enjoyment or for sale on sites like Etsy has resulted in the common practice of buying wholesale costume jewelry in bulk and using it for parts.

There is a rise in demand for artificial or imitation jewelry by 85% due to the increase in gold prices, according to a 2011 report.

See also
 Marcasite jewelry

References

Jewellery components